Protein phosphatase 1 regulatory subunit 3C also known as PTG is an enzyme that in humans is encoded by the PPP1R3C gene.

Function 

Protein phosphatase-1 (PP1) participates in the regulation of a wide variety of cellular functions by reversible protein phosphorylation. The ability of PP1 to regulate diverse functions resides in its capacity to interact with a variety of regulatory subunits that may target PP1 to specific subcellular locations, modulate its substrate specificity, and allow its activity to be responsive to extracellular signals. Several targeting subunits of PP1 have been identified, including PPP1R5, the glycogen-binding subunits GM, GL, PTG  and R6  and PPP1R4, and the nuclear inhibitor of PP1 (PPP1R8).

References

Further reading